Poço Barreto is a halt on the Algarve Line in the Silves municipality, Portugal. It was opened on the 19th of March de 1900, and served as terminus for the railway line until the 1st of February 1902, when the section to Silves was opened.

Services
This halt is used by regional trains, operated by Comboios de Portugal.

References

Railway stations in Portugal
Railway stations opened in 1900